RSE may refer to:
Ramtha's School of Enlightenment, a spiritual school in the United States
Realistic Sound Engine, a sound output format in Guitar Pro
Red Seal Endorsement, post-nominal letters signifying attainment of Canada's official journeyperson certification in the trades
Relationship and Sex Education, an education curriculum in United Kingdom schools
Red Storm Entertainment, a video game company
Refractory status epilepticus, the persistent form of status epilepticus despite intervention
Relative standard error, a measure of a statistical estimate's reliability
Rensselaer Society of Engineers, a local fraternity at Rensselaer Polytechnic Institute, state of New York
Research software engineering, the use of software engineering practices in research
Rhein-Sieg-Eisenbahn, a German railway company
the IATA airport code of Rose Bay Water Airport, a water airport located in the suburb of Rose Bay in Sydney, Australia
Royal Society of Edinburgh, Scotland's national academy of science and letters
Rwanda Stock Exchange, a stock exchange in Rwanda 
Pokémon Ruby and Sapphire and Pokémon Emerald, the three main titles of the third generation of the Pokémon series

See also
the Rosenberg self-esteem scale (RSES)
RSE Kriens (missile), a Swiss-developed air defence missile
Békéscsabai RSE, a Hungarian women's volleyball club
the Odakyu 20000 series RSE, an electric multiple unit (EMU) train type in Japan